Methylobacterium frigidaeris is a Gram-negative, aerobic, methylotrophic and motile bacteria from the genus of Methylobacterium which has been isolated from an air conditioning system from Korea.

References 

Hyphomicrobiales
Bacteria described in 2018